Gillian Ellsay (born 26 March 1997) is a Canadian professional racing cyclist, who currently rides for UCI Women's Continental Team .

References

External links

1997 births
Living people
Canadian female cyclists
Place of birth missing (living people)